Dame Ann Louise Robinson  is a British medical doctor and academic. She is Regius Professor of Ageing at Newcastle University, and director of the Newcastle University Institute for Ageing.

Robinson earned an MBBS in 1985 from Newcastle University, MRCGP in 1989, DFFP in 1991, DCH in 1998 from the University of London, and Dip ME 1992 from the University of Dundee.

Robinson trained as a GP in rural Northumberland.

In the 2019 New Year Honours, Robinson was awarded DBE, "For services to Primary Care". For her work on the care of dementia, she was awarded a Research Professorship at the National Institute for Health Research (NIHR).

References

Living people
Academics of Newcastle University
Alumni of the University of Dundee
20th-century British medical doctors
21st-century British medical doctors
British women medical doctors
Dames Commander of the Order of the British Empire
NIHR Research Professors
Year of birth missing (living people)